Kim Kim Nørholt Andersen (born 30 April 1972) is a Danish football manager and former player who most recently worked as head coach of Fredericia KFUM.

Playing career
A midfielder, Norholt started his senior career with Vejle Boldklub. In 1997, he signed for Silkeborg IF in the Danish Superliga, where he made 67 league appearances and scored ten goals. After that, he played for Kolding FC, Fredericia, Knattspyrnufélagið Fram, and Club Lagoons.

Notes

References

External links 
 Nørholt got coaching success in ambitious Greenland 
 Unique connection has immortalized Danish football players on Paradise Island 
 Kim Nørholt and the Maldivian connection 
 The brothers ball will away from the basement 
 The heavy void after the football

1972 births
Living people
Danish men's footballers
Association football midfielders
Danish Superliga players
Vejle Boldklub players
Silkeborg IF players
Kolding IF players
Kolding FC players
FC Fredericia players
Knattspyrnufélagið Fram players